Plumulariidae is a family of hydrozoans.

Genus
According to the World Register of Marine Species, the following genera belong to this family:
Callicarpa Fewkes, 1881
Cladacanthella Calder, 1997
Dentitheca Stechow, 1919
Hippurella Allman, 1877
Nemertesia Lamouroux, 1812
Plumularia Lamarck, 1816
Pseudoplumaria Ramil & Vervoort, 1992
Schizoplumularia Ansín Agís, Ramil & Calder, 2016
Sibogella Billard, 1911

Plumularidae of America (1900) 
Charles Cleveland Nutting, an American zoologist, wrote the first survey of what he then called 'Plumularidæ' of America in 1900. Before him, Louis Agassiz had mentioned only three species in 1862. His son Alexander Agassiz recognized six species. In 1877 George Allman described twenty-six species. Nutting 
gives descriptions and figures of about one hundred and twenty-one species! He writes:

References

Sources 
 

 
Plumularioidea
Cnidarian families
Taxa named by Louis Agassiz
Taxa described in 1862